Founded in 1874, the Chicago Bar Association (CBA) is a voluntary bar association with over 20,000 members. Like other bar associations, it concerns itself with professional ethics, networking among members, and continuing legal education. It is located adjacent to the University of Illinois Chicago School of Law in the Chicago Loop.

Notable members
Notable members included Illinois state representative (1922-46 and 1948–50) David Ivar Swanson and prominent attorney Earl B. Dickerson who argued Hansberry v. Lee before the  Supreme Court.

See also

 Robert Hervey - Scottish born Canadian lawyer who founded the CBA after he left Canada to practice law in Chicago.
 William C. Goudy - first President of the CBA in 1874

References

External links
 Chicago Bar Association Home Page

American municipal bar associations
1874 establishments in Illinois
Legal organizations in Chicago
Organizations established in 1874